Sixten Joaquim Mohlin (born 17 January 1996) is a footballer who plays as a goalkeeper for Superettan club Örgryte IS. Born in the Netherlands and raised in Sweden, he represents the Cape Verde national team.

International career
Mohlin was born in the Netherlands to a Swedish father and a Cape Verdean mother, and moved to Sweden at the age of 1. He was a youth international for Sweden at the under-17 and under-19 stages. He represented the Cape Verde national team in a friendly 2–0 loss to Senegal on 8 June 2021.

Honours
Sweden U17
 FIFA U-17 World Cup Third place: 2013

References

External links
 
 

1996 births
Living people
Footballers from Rotterdam
Citizens of Cape Verde through descent
Cape Verdean footballers
Cape Verde international footballers
Swedish footballers
Sweden youth international footballers
Cape Verdean people of Swedish descent
Swedish people of Cape Verdean descent
Swedish sportspeople of African descent
Malmö FF players
Dalkurd FF players
Östersunds FK players
Örgryte IS players
Allsvenskan players
Association football goalkeepers